Prasanna Venkatachalapathi Temple is a Hindu temple situated on top of a hill called Perumalmalai located 3 kms from Thuraiyur in Tiruchirappalli district. The presiding deity is the Hindu god Vishnu. The temple is believed to have been constructed by the grandchildren of Karikala, who are worshipped here.

References

External links

Hindu temples in Tiruchirappalli district